Springville is a city in St. Clair County, Alabama, United States. It incorporated in December 1880. At the 2020 census the population was 4,786, up from 4,080 in 2010.

Geography
Springville is located at  (33.768950, −86.471037).

Demographics

2000 census
At the 2000 census there were 2,521 people, 990 households, and 767 families living in the town. The racial makeup of the town was 90.56% White, 7.74% Black or African American, 0.16% Native American, 0.28% Asian, 0.16% Pacific Islander, and 1.11% from two or more races. 0.24% of the population were Hispanic or Latino of any race.
Of the 990 households 34.4% had children under the age of 18 living with them, 62.8% were married couples living together, 11.5% had a female householder with no husband present, and 22.5% were non-families. 20.5% of households were one person and 8.3% were one person aged 65 or older. The average household size was 2.55 and the average family size was 2.93.

The age distribution was 24.9% under the age of 18, 6.9% from 18 to 24, 30.1% from 25 to 44, 26.2% from 45 to 64, and 11.9% 65 or older. The median age was 38 years. For every 100 females, there were 97.4 males. For every 100 females aged 18 and over, there were 88.5 males.

The median household income was $43,397 and the median family income was $53,859. Males had a median income of $35,977 versus $25,542 for females. The per capita income for the town was $20,518. About 8.0% of families and 10.8% of the population were below the poverty line, including 11.1% of those under age 45–55 and 23.4% of those age 65 or over.

2010 census
At the 2010 census there were 4,080 people, 1,561 households, and 1,223 families living in the town. The racial makeup of the town was 93.6% White, 4.7% Black or African American, 0.3% Native American, 0.4% Asian, 0.1% Pacific Islander, and .9% from two or more races. 0.7% of the population were Hispanic or Latino of any race.
Of the 1,561 households 31.5% had children under the age of 18 living with them, 66.0% were married couples living together, 9.5% had a female householder with no husband present, and 21.7% were non-families. 19.3% of households were one person and 8.1% were one person aged 65 or older. The average household size was 2.61 and the average family size was 2.98.

The age distribution was 23.8% under the age of 18, 6.7% from 18 to 24, 22.9% from 25 to 44, 32.3% from 45 to 64, and 14.3% 65 or older. The median age was 42.6 years. For every 100 females, there were 95.3 males. For every 100 females aged 18 and over, there were 95.7 males.

The median household income was $66,667 and the median family income was $75,679. Males had a median income of $60,893 versus $31,782 for females. The per capita income for the town was $27,526. About 7.9% of families and 9.2% of the population were below the poverty line, including 11.6% of those under age 18 and 9.9% of those age 65 or over.

2020 census

As of the 2020 United States census, there were 4,786 people, 1,450 households, and 1,180 families residing in the city.

Movies 
Although a small Alabama town, Springville has been the site of filming for two movies:
1987 – a gangster film called The Verne Miller Story (released on video entitled Gangland) starring Scott Glenn
2001 – Rustin (starring Meat Loaf and Zachary Ty Bryan)

Notable people
Artie Wilson, former Major League Baseball player.
Aubrey Willis Williams, head of the National Youth Administration during the New Deal.
Casey Mize, MLB pitcher for the Detroit Tigers.
Hank Patterson, who played Mr. Fred Ziffel, on Green Acres.
Howard Cruse, alternative cartoonist
John Avery House, former Mississippi State University football player from 2001-2005. Also, the first high school student athlete to play in Alabama High School Athletic Association Basketball All-Star Game and Football All-Star Game.
Trinity the Tuck (Ryan Taylor), an American drag queen and recording artist known for competing on the ninth season of RuPaul's Drag Race and for winning the fourth season of RuPaul's Drag Race All Stars.
Cassidy Jo Jacks, contestant on the first season of Farmer Wants A Wife.

References

External links

Cities in St. Clair County, Alabama
Cities in Alabama
Birmingham metropolitan area, Alabama